Halu Kaleh or Halu Kalleh may refer to:
 Halu Kaleh, Gilan
 Halu Kaleh, Mazandaran